"Apnea" ("Apnoea") is a song recorded and written by Guatemalan recording artist Ricardo Arjona, released on 4 March 2014. The song is the lead single from his fourteenth studio album, Viaje. At the beginning of 2014, Arjona explained to People en Espanol that he couldn't find another perfect word to describe his past and reminiscing about his memories "Apnea" was the best word to fulfill his journey (Viaje). The music video was nominated for Video of the Year at the Lo Nuestro Awards of 2015.

Charts

Year-end charts

See also
List of Billboard number-one Latin songs of 2014

References

2014 songs
2014 singles
Ricardo Arjona songs
Songs written by Ricardo Arjona
Record Report Top 100 number-one singles
Record Report Top Latino number-one singles